The 29th and final SPAR European Cup took place in June 2008.  Track and field events were held on 21 and 22 June 2008 at the Parc des Sports Stadium in Annecy, France.  Other event venues included Estádio Dr. Magalhães Pessoa in Portugal and facilities in Istanbul, Turkey (for First League track and field events), Kadriorg Stadium in Estonia and SNP Stadium in Slovakia (for Second League track and field events), and facilities in Eindhoven, Netherlands (for diving and other water sports events). The Parc des Sports Annecy Stadium was also stadium for 1998 World Junior Championships in Athletics. It was the last edition of the European Cup which from 2009 has been replaced by European Team Championships combining the men and women competitions.

Super League

Final standings

Men

Women

Day 1 standings

Men's results

Women's results

Abakumova later disqualified for doping

First League

Nations of 1st League (16 teams, men and women, in two groups of equal level).

Group A
at Estádio Dr. Magalhães Pessoa, Leiria, (Portugal), on 21 & 22 June 2008.

Men's
 
 
  
 
  
 
 

  was relegated into League 1 from Superleague 2007 and  &  are promoted into the 1st League from 2007 2nd League for 2008 European Cup.

Women's
 
  
  
 
 
 
 

  was relegated into League 1 from Superleague 2007 and  &  are promoted into the 1st League from 2nd League 2007 for 2008 European Cup.

Day 1

Events and winners

Standings

Group B
at Enka Sadi Gülçelik Stadium, Istanbul, (Turkey), on 21 & 22 June 2008.
Men's
 
 
  
 
  
 
 

  was relegated into League 1 from Superleague 2007 and  &  are promoted into the 1st League from 2nd League 2007 for 2008 European Cup.

Women's
 
  
 
  
 
 
 

  was relegated into League 1 from Superleague 2007 and  &  are promoted into the 1st League from 2nd League 2007 for 2008 European Cup.

Day 1

Events and winners

Standings

Second League

Group A
at Kadrioru Stadium, Tallinn, (Estonia), on 21 & 22 June 2008.

Men's
 
  
 
  
 
 
 

 &  are relegated into 2nd League from 1st League 2007 for 2008 European Cup.

Women's
 
  
 
  
 
 
 

 &  are relegated into 2nd League from 1st League 2007 for 2008 European Cup.

Day 1

Events and winners

Standings

Group B
at SNP Stadium, Banská Bystrica, (Slovakia), on 21 & 22 June 2008.

Men's
AASSE 
  
 
  
 
 
 
 
 
  
 
 
 

 &  are relegated into 2nd League from 1st League 2007 for 2008 European Cup.

Women's
AASSE 
  
 
  
 
 
 
 
 
  
 
 
 

 &  are relegated into 2nd League from 1st League 2007 for 2008 European Cup.

Day 1

Events and winners

Standings

See also
European Cup in Athletics 2007

Notes

External links
Annecy European Cup 2008 Website (english) – Official website
European Cup First & Second League 2008 – event coverage at European-athletics.org
 European Cup 2008, 1st League, Group A in Leiria – Federação Portuguesa de Atletismo website
 European Cup 2008, 1st League, Group B in Istanbul – Official website
 European Cup 2008, 2nd League, Group A in Tallinn – Official website
 European Cup 2008, 2nd League, Group B in Banska Bystrica – Official website

European Cup (athletics)
European Cup (Athletics), 2008
International athletics competitions hosted by Portugal
International athletics competitions hosted by Slovakia
Sport in Istanbul
Athletics
Athletics
European Cup (athletics)
Athletics
Athletics
International athletics competitions hosted by France
International athletics competitions hosted by Turkey
International athletics competitions hosted by Estonia
2000s in Istanbul